Pamproux is a commune in the Deux-Sèvres département, Nouvelle-Aquitaine, France.

References

Communes of Deux-Sèvres